Trilophus is a genus of beetles in the family Carabidae, containing the following species:

 Trilophus acuminatus Balkenohl, 1999
 Trilophus alternans Balkenohl, 1999
 Trilophus appulsus Balkenohl, 1999
 Trilophus arcuatus Balkenohl, 1999
 Trilophus baehri Balkenohl, 1999
 Trilophus birmanicus (Bates, 1892)
 Trilophus convexus Balkenohl, 1999
 Trilophus crinitus Balkenohl, 1999
 Trilophus ellipticus Balkenohl, 1999
 Trilophus elongatus Balkenohl, 1999
 Trilophus fuscus Balkenohl, 1999
 Trilophus hirsutus Balkenohl, 1999
 Trilophus hispidulus (Putzeys, 1866)
 Trilophus imitator Balkenohl, 1999
 Trilophus interpunctatus (Putzeys, 1866)
 Trilophus latiusculus Balkenohl, 1999
 Trilophus loebli Balkenohl, 1999
 Trilophus lompei Balkenohl, 1999
 Trilophus palpireductus Balkenohl, 1999
 Trilophus parallelus Balkenohl, 1999
 Trilophus schawalleri Balkenohl, 1999
 Trilophus schmidti (Putzeys, 1877)
 Trilophus serratulus Balkenohl, 1999
 Trilophus serratus Balkenohl, 1999
 Trilophus setosus Balkenohl, 1999
 Trilophus tonkinensis Balkenohl, 1999
 Trilophus variabilis Balkenohl, 1999
 Trilophus weberi Balkenohl, 1999

References

Scaritinae